The 1915 Michigan Agricultural Aggies football team was an American football team that represented Michigan Agricultural College (MAC) as an independent during the 1915 college football season. In their fifth and final year under head coach John Macklin, the Aggies compiled a 5–1 record and outscored their opponents 258 to 38.

At the end of the 1915 season, fullback Neno DaPrato was a consensus first-team selection on the 1915 College Football All-America Team.  He was called "the greatest scoring machine of the year" after scoring 130 points in just six games during the 1915 season.

Schedule

References

Michigan Agricultural
Michigan State Spartans football seasons
Michigan Agricultural Aggies football